Shemilt is a surname.  Notable people with the surname include:

 David Shemilt (born 1964), Canadian swimmer
 Elaine Shemilt (born 1954), Scottish artist and researcher
 Leslie Shemilt (1919–2011), Canadian chemical engineer and academic